Lac La Biche Airport  is located  west of Lac La Biche, Alberta, Canada.

References

External links

Place to Fly on COPA's Places to Fly airport directory

Registered aerodromes in Alberta
Lac La Biche County